Relentless is the eighteenth studio album by guitarist Yngwie Malmsteen, released on November 23, 2010, through his independent label Rising Force Records. It is his second album with ex-Judas Priest and ex-Iced Earth singer Tim "Ripper" Owens, after 2008's Perpetual Flame.

Track listing

Personnel
 Yngwie Malmsteen - lead & rhythm guitars, bass, additional keyboards, backing vocals and lead vocals on "Look At You Now"
 Tim "Ripper" Owens - lead vocals
 Nick Marino "Marinovic" - keyboards
 Patrick Johansson - Drums

References

Neoclassical albums
2010 albums
Yngwie Malmsteen albums